Alexander Vladimirovich Tatarintsev (born 13 March 1990) is a Russian handball player for Hörður and the Russian national team.

In January 2023, he signed with Hörður of the Icelandic Úrvalsdeild karla.

References

1990 births
Living people
Russian male handball players
Sportspeople from Stavropol
Expatriate handball players in Poland
Russian expatriate sportspeople in Spain
Russian expatriate sportspeople in Poland
Russian expatriate sportspeople in Sweden
IFK Kristianstad players